Jean Berthoin (January 12, 1895 in Enghien-les-Bains, Val-d'Oise – February 25, 1979 in Paris) was a French politician. As Minister of National Education under Charles de Gaulle, he instituted a policy of compulsory education for all children, both French and foreign citizens, until the age of sixteen, building on the earlier reforms of 1936. Implemented in 1959, this was known as the Berthoin Ordinance. He also suggested that the baccalauréat be abolished, prompting a significant backlash in the Parisian press.

Prior to World War II, Berthoin had been the director of national security (Sûreté) in the French Interior Ministry.

References 

1895 births
1979 deaths
People from Enghien-les-Bains
Politicians from Île-de-France
Radical Party (France) politicians
French Ministers of National Education
French interior ministers
French Senators of the Fourth Republic
French Senators of the Fifth Republic
French Resistance members
French people of the Algerian War
Senators of Isère